Terpyridine (2,2';6',2"-terpyridine, often abbreviated to Terpy or Tpy) is a heterocyclic compound derived from pyridine. It is a white solid that is soluble in most organic solvents.  The compound is mainly used as a ligand in coordination chemistry.

Synthesis
Terpyridine was first synthesized by G. Morgan and F. H. Burstall in 1932 by the oxidative coupling of pyridines. This method, however, proceeded in low yields.  More efficient syntheses have since been described, mainly starting from 2-acetylpyridine. One method produces an enaminone by the reaction of 2-acetylpyridine with N,N-dimethylformamide dimethyl acetal.  The base-catalyzed reaction of 2-acetylpyridine with carbon disulfide followed by alkylation with methyl iodide gives C5H4NCOCH=C(SMe)2.  Condensation of this species with 2-acetylpyridine forms the related 1,5-diketone, which condenses with ammonium acetate to form a terpyridine.  Treatment of this derivative with Raney nickel removes the thioether group.

Other methods have been developed for the synthesis of terpyridine and its substituted derivatives.  Substituted terpyridines are also synthesized from palladium-catalyzed cross-coupling reactions. It can be prepared from bis-triazinyl pyridine.

Properties

Terpyridine is a tridentate ligand that binds metals at three meridional sites giving two adjacent 5-membered MN2C2 chelate rings. Terpyridine forms complexes with most transition metal ion as do other polypyridine compounds, such as 2,2'-bipyridine and 1,10-phenanthroline. Complexes containing two terpyridine complexes, i.e. [M(Terpy)2]n+ are common.  They differ structurally from the related [M(Bipy)3]n+ complexes in being achiral.

Terpyridine complexes, like other polypyridine complexes, exhibit characteristic optical and electrochemical properties: metal-to-ligand charge transfer (MLCT) in the visible region, reversible reduction and oxidation, and fairly intense luminescence.

Because they are pi-acceptors, terpyridine and bipyridine tend to stabilize metals in lower oxidation states. For instance in acetonitrile solution, it is possible to generate the [M(Terpy)2]+ (M = Ni, Co).

Related compounds
 bis-triazinyl pyridines are related to terpyridine in their binding to metals.
 quaterpyridine

See also
 Chelating ligand
 Pincer ligand
 Terthiophene

References

Chelating agents
Pyridines
Heterocyclic compounds with 3 rings